Lee Woo-ryong (born 8 April 1961) is a South Korean former professional tennis player.

Active in the 1980s, Lee is a native of Gimhae and reached a best singles world ranking of 385.

Lee was a men's doubles gold medalist at the 1982 Asian Games, partnering Kim Choon-ho.

During the early 1980s he was a member of the South Korea Davis Cup team, debuting in a 1981 World Group relegation play-off against Italy. He played in a total of three singles and one doubles rubber during his career, with his other appearances coming in 1983 ties against the Philippines and Japan.

Following a stroke he suffered in 2004, which caused paralysis in his left arm, Lee took up the sport of table tennis and competes in national events for disabled athletes.

See also
List of South Korea Davis Cup team representatives

References

External links
 
 
 

1961 births
Living people
South Korean male tennis players
People from Gimhae
Tennis players at the 1982 Asian Games
Medalists at the 1982 Asian Games
Asian Games gold medalists for South Korea
Asian Games medalists in tennis
Sportspeople from South Gyeongsang Province
20th-century South Korean people